Grushin (masculine) or Grushina (feminine) is a Russian surname. It is derived from the sobriquet "груша" ("pear"). Notable people with the surname include:

Aleksandr Grushin (born 1984), Russian footballer
Andrey Grushin (born 1988), Russian footballer
Boris Grushin (1929–2007), Russian Soviet philosopher, sociologist and scientist
Elena Grushina (born 1975), Ukrainian ice dancer
Olga Grushin (born 1971), Russian-American writer
Peter Grushin (1906–1993), Russian Soviet rocket scientist

Russian-language surnames